Attila Stefáni (born 6 November 1973) is a Hungarian motorcycle speedway rider who was a member of Hungary's national team.

Career
In 2002 he won the Hungarian title to become the Hungarian national champion. Stefáni rode for the Oxford Cheetahs in 1996 under the assumed name "Mark Frost" assuming a South African nationality.

Career details 
 Team World Championship (Speedway World Team Cup and Speedway World Cup)
 2001 - 10th place
 2002 - 10th place
 2004 - 8th place
 2005 - 3rd place in Qualifying round 2
 2007 - 4th place in Qualifying round 2
 Individual European Championship
 2003 -  Slaný - 15th place (3 pts)
 European Pairs Championship
 2004 -  Debrecen - 4th place (4 pts)
 European Club Champions' Cup
 2004 -  Ljubljana - 5th place (6 pts)

See also 
 Hungary national speedway team

References 

1973 births
Living people
Hungarian speedway riders